Wallace Warren Cross (September 23, 1887 – August 4, 1973) was a medical doctor and long serving politician from Alberta, Canada.

Cross was elected in the 1935 Alberta general election for the Alberta Social Credit Party for the Hand Hills district. He served 6 terms in office retiring from provincial politics in 1959.

Cross became minister of health under Premier William Aberhart. During his time as minister, he opened a series of cancer clinics across the province, and  actively focused the Department of Healths resources on cancer treatment. He died in Edmonton in 1973.

The Cross Cancer Institute, which opened in 1968, is named in his honor.

References

External links
Cross Cancer Institute History

Alberta Social Credit Party MLAs
1973 deaths
1887 births
Members of the Executive Council of Alberta